Rockwell House is a historic home located at Dryden in Tompkins County, New York. It was built about 1860 and is a 2-story, wood-frame residence consisting of a three-by-three-bay main portion and two-by-two-bay rear wing in the Italianate style.

It was listed on the National Register of Historic Places in 1984.

References

Houses on the National Register of Historic Places in New York (state)
Italianate architecture in New York (state)
Houses completed in 1860
Houses in Tompkins County, New York
National Register of Historic Places in Tompkins County, New York